The 12th European Badminton Championships were held in Moscow, Soviet Union, between 8 and 14 April 1990, and hosted by the European Badminton Union and the Sovietic Badminton Federation.

Medalists

Results

Semi-finals

Finals

Medal account

References

External links 
 Results at BE

European Badminton Championships
European Badminton Championships
B
B
Badminton in the Soviet Union
European Badminton Championships
European Badminton Championships